TSOP can stand for:

"TSOP (The Sound of Philadelphia)", a 1974 hit single by the band MFSB
The State of Palestine, the sovereign Palestinian state
TSOP Records, a subsidiary of Philadelphia International Records, named after the hit MFSB song
The Sound of Perseverance, a 1998 album by the band Death 
Thin small-outline packages, a type of surface mount electronics technology
This Side of Paradise, the 1920 debut novel by F. Scott Fitzgerald

 TSOP.. Series (Example TSOP17), IR Receiver Modules for Remote Control Systems